This is a list of people from Kingston upon Hull in the north-east of England with a Wikipedia page. Groups and sub-groups are in alphabetical order; persons likewise.

Arts and humanities

Architecture
George Frederick Bodley
Cuthbert Brodrick
Alfred Gelder, architect and five-times mayor of Hull

Education
James Evans, Hull-born missionary and amateur linguist; best remembered for his creation of the "syllabic" writing system for Ojibwe and Cree, later adapted to other languages such as Inuktitut
Margaret Kissling, missionary to Sierra Leone and New Zealand
Joseph Malet Lambert (1853–1931), author, Canon of York, Chairman of Hull University Board, educationalist, social reformer

Entertainment
John Alderton, actor, grew up in Hull and attended Kingston High School
Lucy Beaumont (Hull born) award-winning stand-up comedian and comedy writer starred at the Edinburgh Fringe Festival in 2012 and wrote the Radio 4 comedy To Hull & Back, starring herself and Maureen Lipman.
Joseph Caley, ballet dancer, currently lead principal with the English National Ballet and formerly principal with Birmingham Royal Ballet
Ian Carmichael OBE, actor, born in Hull
Sir Tom Courtenay, actor, star of stage, film and TV; graduate of RADA and honorary graduate of the University of Hull
Robert Crampton, Times journalist, grew up in Hull
Liam Garrigan, former student of Wyke College and Northern Theatre Company, star of TV dramas Casualty, The Chase and Agatha Christie's Marple, was born and raised in Hull.
Liam Gerrard, BAFTA nominated film, TV and theatre actor was born and raised in Hull.  Films include Peterloo, Death Defying Acts and Walter Tull: Britain's First Black Officer 
Gareth Hale, half of the comedy duo Hale and Pace, was born in Hull.
Vanessa Hooper, former dancer with the Royal Ballet and Northern Ballet Theatre, now a senior examiner, lecturer and committee member of the IDTA
Michael Jibson, actor, grew up in Hessle and attended Hessle High School; originated the role of Joe Casey in the West End Musical Our House; has worked in film, TV and theatre; films include The Bank Job and Les Misérables
Andrew Lincoln, actor, spent some time growing up in Hull
Maureen Lipman, film, theatre and television actress, columnist, and comedian
Derren Litten, actor, writer, Benidorm
Dorothy Mackaill, motion picture actress
Peter Martin, best known for playing Joe Carroll in The Royle Family and Len Reynolds in ITV's Emmerdale
Jordan Metcalfe, actor, known as Adil the Genie in Nickelodeon's Genie in the House and Brian in Misfits
Liam Mower, dancer and actor, famous for originating the title role in Billy Elliot the Musical and being the youngest person ever to win an Olivier Award for Best Actor for the role
Andy Newton-Lee, actor
Roy North, actor and TV presenter best known for his appearances as Mr Roy in 1970s children's show Basil Brush
Gemma Oaten (born 8 May 1984 in Hull) actress who has starred in Doctors and who is best known as Rachel Breckle in Emmerdale from July 2011 until 2015. Appeared on Celebrity Dinner Date in 2016.
Paul Popplewell, film, TV and theatre award-winning actor, attended school in Hull.
Barrie Rutter (b. 1946), actor, director, and founder of Northern Broadsides
Gavin Scott, novelist, broadcaster and film/TV writer best known for writing Small Soldiers, The Borrowers and The Young Indiana Jones Chronicles
Reece Shearsmith, actor and writer, famous as a member of The League of Gentlemen
Debra Stephenson, actress, comedian and impressionist born in Hull, star of TV dramas Bad Girls and Coronation Street
Oliver Stokes, actor who plays Michael Garvey in Benidorm
Isy Suttie, stand up comedian, writer, and actress; born in Hull; known for the role of Dobby in the British sitcom Peep Show
Gerald Thomas, director of the Carry On films 
Norman Collier, comedian, best known for his 'faulty microphone' routine and for his chicken impressions was born and raised in Hull

Literature
Richard Bean, playwright
Emma Scarr Booth, 19th-century writer
John Godber, playwright; Artistic Director of the Hull Truck Theatre Company, 1984–2011
Martin Goodman, writer
Philip Larkin, Coventry-born poet, lived in Hull for most of his life as resident librarian at Hull University
Ted Lewis, author of Jack's Return Home, later filmed as Get Carter, attended Hull School of Art
Andrew Marvell, 17th-century metaphysical poet
William Mayne, children's writer
Sir Andrew Motion, Poet Laureate, taught English at the University of Hull (1976–1980)
Alan Plater, playwright and screenwriter, worked extensively in British television from the 1960s to the 2000s; moved to Hull as a child
Stevie Smith, poet and novelist best known for her poem  "Not Waving but Drowning"
Amy Catherine Walton, children's writer
Stanley Wells, Shakespeare scholar

Music
Trevor Bolder, bass player for David Bowie, The Spiders From Mars, Uriah Heep, and Wishbone Ash.
Patricia Bredin, singer; UK's first entry to Eurovision Song Contest in 1957 with "All"; starred in a number of films in the 1950s and 1960s.
Norman Cook (also known as Fatboy Slim), moved to Hull in the 1980s and became a member of indie pop band The Housemartins.
Dave Hemingway, born and raised in Hull, drummer with the Housemartins and went on to form The Beautiful South with Paul Heaton.
John Bacchus Dykes, 19th-century hymnist, composer of the popular maritime hymn "Eternal Father, Strong to Save"
Everything but the Girl, band formed by Tracey Thorn and Ben Watt whilst they were students at Hull University.
Roland Gift, lead singer of Fine Young Cannibals, grew up in the city and attended Kelvin Hall Secondary School
Paul Heaton, musician in The Beautiful South
Jonathan Dowsland, professor of Computer Science, Information Technology who acquired a degree in music. He has developed the - "Jonathan Downsland Timer App" app
Ronnie Hilton, British crooner whose chart hits included the UK number one hit "No Other Love"
Alfred Hollins, composer and international concert organist, born in Hull in 1865.
Rob Hubbard, composer, known for computer game theme music, especially for 1980s microcomputers such as the Commodore 64, which showcased the potential of the Commodore 64's sound hardware and gave examples of how music can improve a gaming experience.
Richard Justice (died 1757), composer, harpsichordist, and organist 
Kingmaker, Indie band formed by three Hull-born musicians including John Andrew, had UK Top 40 singles in the late 1980s and the early 1990s, but split in 1995.
Joe Longthorne, singer known for impersonating Shirley Bassey
Lene Lovich, US-born pupil at Greatfield High School, found fame on the Stiff Label in the late 1970s, with a No. 3 hit with "Lucky Number"
The Paddingtons, Indie band from Hull which had two UK Top 40 singles in 2005: "Panic Attack" (No. 25) and "50 To The Pound" (No. 32).
Henry Priestman, record producer and singer/songwriter for the 1980s hit band The Christians.
Mick Ronson, guitarist, known for work with David Bowie, hailed from Hull.
Spacemaid, britpop group, formed in 1992
Cosey Fanni Tutti, founding member of industrial band Throbbing Gristle, formed the performance art group COUM Transmissions in Hull with Genesis P-Orridge, while attending the university from 1969–1971. It changed its name to Throbbing Gristle in 1976 after moving to London.
Gay-Yee Westerhoff, Hull-born Chinese/English cellist of the all-female string quartet Bond
David Whitfield, 1950s male tenor vocalist, the UK's most successful male singer in the US in the pre-rock years, still one of only six artists to spend ten or more consecutive weeks at No. 1 on the UK Singles Chart
Calum Scott, Hull-born singer known for a Britain's Got Talent appearance and a cover of Robyn's Dancing On My Own that reached No. 2 on the UK Singles Chart
Scarlet, 1990s female duo of Cheryl Parker and Jo Youle, formed in Hull, with UK hits in 1995 with "Independent Love Song" (No. 12) and with "I Wanna Be Free To Be With Him" (No. 21). "Love Hangover" and "Bad Girl" both peaked at No. 54. They released two albums, Naked and Chemistry.

Visual arts
Henry Dawson, 19th-century landscape painter, born in Hull
John Ward, early 19th-century painter of marine seascapes

Politics
William de la Pole (Chief Baron of the Exchequer) (d. 1386), first Mayor of the city
His son Michael de la Pole, 1st Earl of Suffolk (c. 1330 – 5 September 1389)
Sir John Hotham, 1st Baronet (c. July 1589 – 3 January 1645), Governor of the city who denied Charles I entry in 1642
Andrew Marvell (31 March 1621 – 16 August 1678), poet, MP for the city, and friend of John Milton
John Ducker (1932–2005), member of the New South Wales Legislative Assembly; president of the New South Wales branch of the Australian Labor Party, 1972–1979
Thomas Ferens (1847–1930), politician, philanthropist, and industrialist; MP for Hull East for 13 years; served the city as a justice of the peace and as High Steward
John Hall, former Prime Minister of New Zealand
John Prescott, Welsh-born former Deputy Prime Minister of the United Kingdom (1997–2007); MP and resident of Hull East since 1970; however, he was born in Wales and identifies as Welsh.
Harry Pursey, politician and MP for Hull East 1945–1970
William Wilberforce, instrumental in the abolition of slavery

Science and scholarship

Chemistry
George William Gray, Hull University professor who first discovered cyanobiphenyl liquid crystals (which had correct stability and temperature properties for application in liquid crystal display technology
George S. Whitby (1887–1972) was the head of the University of Akron rubber laboratory and for many years was the only person in the United States who taught rubber chemistry.

Computer science
Rob Miles, Microsoft MVP

Geology
Alfred Harker, petrologist

History
A. G. Dickens, historian of the English Reformation
Alex J. Kay (born 1979), historian
Philip Sugden (1947–2014), historian

Mathematics
Ernest William Brown, mathematician and astronomer
Keith Devlin, mathematician and popular science writer
John Venn, mathematician, born in Hull in 1834; responsible for the Venn diagram

Physics
Edward Arthur Milne, astrophysicist and mathematician.

Physiology and medicine
Stephen C. West FRS, biochemist and molecular biologist.

Sports
Nick Barmby, former Hull City A.F.C. winger and manager
Luke Campbell, Olympic champion who earned a gold medal in boxing at the London 2012 Summer Olympics
Tommy Coyle (born 1989), challenger for British super-lightweight title and Commonwealth lightweight title holder
Stanley Gene, rugby league player (retired 2008) who has made East Hull his home for many years
Tony Green, sports commentator and television presenter
Lewis Harris, rugby league player
Jack Harrison, rugby league footballer and posthumous Victoria Cross recipient
Willie Intin, cricketer
Damian Johnson, BBC Sports broadcaster and journalist
Philip Kedward, cricketer
Julia Lee, first female rugby league referee
Ebenezer Cobb Morley (1831–1924), sportsman regarded as the "father" of The Football Association and modern Association football
Katie O'Brien, born in Beverley, 5 miles (8 km) from Hull, tennis player,
Clive Sullivan, rugby league player, played for both of Hull's rugby league teams. The main road into Hull from the Humber Bridge is named Clive Sullivan Way after him.
Carol Thomas, former England Women’s Football Captain
Dean Windass, had two spells with Hull City and scored the goal that helped the club to promotion to the top flight of English football for the first time in its history.

Other
Henry Wolsey Bayfield, British naval officer and surveyor who charted thousands of Canadian Islands. Bayfield, Wisconsin, is named after him.
Lillian Bilocca, British fisheries worker and campaigner for improved safety in fishing fleet as leader of the "headscarf revolutionaries"
Sarah Cruddas International Space Journalist, Author and TV Host on Discovery Channel
Ronald Dearing, Baron Dearing CB, senior civil servant; Chairman and Chief Executive of the Post Office Ltd
"Gassy Jack" John Deighton, founder of Gastown, precursor to modern-day Vancouver, BC, Canada
Michelle Dewberry, winner of the second British series of reality TV show The Apprentice business woman and Sky News presenter
Sir John Ellerman, shipping tycoon of Ellerman Lines fame; reputedly the richest man in Britain during his lifetime
John Fearn, whaler and first European to visit Nauru. 
Joseph James Forrester, businessman
James Hall (unknown, Hull – 1612, Greenland), explorer in the service of the Danish King
Amy Johnson, aviator; born on St Georges Road in West Hull, attended Kingston High School
Zachariah Pearson (1821–1891), shipowner, today known for his gift of land to Hull, which was used to establish the City's first public park, later known as Pearson Park
Jim Radford (born 1928), folk singer, shantyman, peace campaigner, former housing activist, youngest known participant in the Allied invasion of Normandy in 1944
J. Arthur Rank, 1st Baron Rank (1888–1972), industrialist and film producer; founder of the Rank Organisation, now known as The Rank Group Plc
Joseph Rank (1854–1943), founder of Rank Hovis McDougall, one of the UK's largest flour-milling businesses 
Sir Harold Reckitt, 2nd Baronet (1868–1930)
Sir James Reckitt, 1st Baronet (1833–1924)
Yasmina Siadatan, winner of the fifth British series of reality TV show The Apprentice
Henry Brarens Sloman (1848–1931), English-German entrepreneur who emigrated first to Hamburg, Germany, and then to Chile, where he established a saltpetre business. He was listed as Hamburg's richest man in 1912.
William Traynor, recipient of the Victoria Cross
Dave Ulliott (also known as Devilfish), Hall of Fame poker player and World Series of Poker bracelet-winner.

See also
Alumni of the University of Hull

References

 
Kingston upon Hull
People